Serbia and Montenegro participated in the Junior Eurovision Song Contest 2005; their only participation during the country's existence. Filip Vučić represented the country with "Ljubav pa fudbal", which finished 13th for the country.

History
Prior to 2005, Serbia and Montenegro had broadcast the 2003 contest.

On 2 August 2005, it was announced that Serbia and Montenegro were to make their debut at the Junior Eurovision Song Contest 2005, at the Ethias Arena in Hasselt, Belgium on 26 November 2005. The national broadcasters Radio Television of Serbia (RTS) and Radio Televizija Crne Gore (RTCG) who are members of the European Broadcasting Union (EBU) was responsible for their debut participation in what would become the one and only time they competed as a nation in the Junior Eurovision Song Contest, prior to the Montenegrin independence referendum in 2006.

Neustrašivi učitelji stranih jezika went on to being Serbia's first participant in 2006 as an independent nation, whilst child-duo Maša Vujadinović and Lejla Vulić represented Montenegro in 2014.

Junior Beovizija 2005
A national selection event entitled Junior Beovizija took place on 29 September 2005, which saw eighteen entries compete to become the first and last participant for Serbia and Montenegro. Filip Vučić won the national final with the song "Ljubav pa fudbal", achieving a score of fifty-eight points.

Artist and song information

Filip Vučić
Filip Vučić (born 11 July 1995) is a Montenegrin singer from Nikšić. He represented Serbia and Montenegro at the Junior Eurovision Song Contest 2005 in their only appearance as a nation at the contest.

At Junior Eurovision
At the running order draw which took place on 17 November 2005, Serbia and Montenegro were drawn to perform tenth during the live televised final on 26 November 2005, following  and preceding .

Participation

Voting
During the voting presentation at the 2005 contest, Serbia and Montenegro awarded and was awarded the following points:

Commentators and spokespersons
The contests are broadcast online worldwide through the official Junior Eurovision Song Contest website junioreurovision.tv and YouTube. In 2015, the online broadcasts featured commentary in English by junioreurovision.tv editor Luke Fisher and 2011 Bulgarian Junior Eurovision Song Contest entrant Ivan Ivanov. The broadcasters from Serbia and Montenegro, RTS and RTCG, sent their own commentators to the contest in order to provide commentary in the Serbian language (for RTS) and Montenegrin language (for RTCG). Spokespersons were also chosen by the national broadcaster in order to announce the awarding points from Serbia and Montenegro. The table below list the details of each commentator and spokesperson since 2005.

See also

As Serbia and Montenegro
Serbia and Montenegro in the Eurovision Song Contest
Serbia and Montenegro in the Eurovision Young Musicians

As Serbia
Serbia in the Junior Eurovision Song Contest
Serbia in the Eurovision Song Contest
Serbia in the Eurovision Young Musicians

As Montenegro
Montenegro in the Junior Eurovision Song Contest
Montenegro in the Eurovision Song Contest

Notes

References 

Countries in the Junior Eurovision Song Contest
Serbian music
Montenegrin music